The Richmond micropolitan area may refer to:

The Richmond, Kentucky micropolitan area, United States
The Richmond, Indiana micropolitan area, United States

See also
Richmond metropolitan area (disambiguation)
Richmond (disambiguation)